The 2012–13 Bradley Braves men's basketball team represented Bradley University during the 2012–13 NCAA Division I men's basketball season. The Braves, led by second year head coach Geno Ford, played their home games at Carver Arena, with four home games at Renaissance Coliseum, and were members of the Missouri Valley Conference. They finished the season 18–17, 7–11 in Missouri Valley play to finish in a three way tie for seventh place. They lost in the first round of the Missouri Valley tournament to Drake. They were invited to the 2013 CIT where they defeated Green Bay and Tulane to advance to the quarterfinals where they lost to fellow Missouri Valley member Northern Iowa.

Roster

Schedule

|-
!colspan=9| Exhibition

|-
!colspan=9| Regular season

|-
!colspan=9| 2013 Missouri Valley Conference tournament

|-
!colspan=9| 2013 CIT

References

Bradley Braves men's basketball seasons
Bradley
Bradley
Brad
Brad